Infinidat is an Israeli-American data storage company.

History
Infinidat was founded by Moshe Yanai in 2011. By 2015 it was valued at $1.2 billion, and in 2017 it was valued at $1.6 billion. The company has offices in 17 countries and two headquarters: one in Waltham, MA and one in Herzliya, Israel.

InfiniBox
In 2013 the company filed for thirty-nine patents, and later that year released its flagship product, the InfiniBox. Each system initially managed about five petabytes of data. 

As of October 2017, the company had shipped about two exabytes worth of storage to its customers. The company uses conventional and flash storage, and has a better than one million IOPS performance and 99.99999 percent reliability. The product is used by large corporations and clients including cloud service providers, telecoms, financial services firms, healthcare providers, and others that require large amounts of data storage.

Funding
In 2015 the company received $150 million in funding during its Series B round led by TPG Growth. 

In 2017, the company received $95 million in funding, in a Series C round led by Goldman Sachs. At this stage it had received $325 million in total funding.

References

Software companies established in 2011
Technology companies of Israel
Technology companies of the United States
Software companies based in Massachusetts
Computer storage companies
Software companies of the United States
2011 establishments in the United States
2011 establishments in Massachusetts
Companies established in 2011